Yassa (alternatively: Yasa, Yasaq, Jazag, Zasag, Ikh Zasag) was the oral law code of the Mongols declared in public in Bukhara by Genghis Khan de facto law of the Mongol Empire even though the "law" was kept secret and never made public. The Yassa seems to have its origin as wartime decrees, which were later codified and expanded to include cultural and lifestyle conventions. By keeping the Yassa secret, the decrees could be modified and used selectively. It is believed that the Yassa was supervised by Genghis Khan himself and his stepbrother Shikhikhutag, then the high judge (in ) of the Mongol Empire. Genghis Khan appointed his second son, Chagatai (later Chagatai Khan), to oversee the laws' execution.

Overview
The Yasa decrees were thought to be comprehensive and specific, but no Mongolian scroll or codex has been found. There are records of excerpts among many chronicles including Makrizi, Vartan, and ibn Batuta. Moreover, copies may have been discovered in Korea as well. The absence of any physical document is historically problematic. Historians are left with secondary sources, conjecture and speculation, which describe much of the content of the overview. Historical certainty about the Yassa is weak compared to the much older Code of Hammurabi (18th century BCE) or the Edicts of Ashoka, (3rd century BCE). The latter was carved for all to see on stone plinths, 12 to 15 m high, which were located throughout Ashoka's empire (now India, Nepal, Pakistan and Afghanistan). The Yassa, which is thought to be written in the Uighaur Mongolian script and written on scrolls, was preserved in secret archives and known only to and read only by the royal family. Beyond being a code of laws, the Yassa may have included philosophical, spiritual and mystical elements and so may have been thought of as a quasi-sacred or magic text.

The exoteric aspect of Yasa outlined laws for various members of the Mongol community such as soldiers, officers and doctors. The Yassa aimed at three things: obedience to Genghis Khan, a binding together of the nomad clans and the merciless punishment of wrongdoing. It concerned itself with people, not property. Unless a man actually confessed, he was not judged guilty. The purpose of many decrees was probably to eliminate social and economic disputes among the Mongols and future allied peoples. Among the rules were no stealing of livestock from other people, the required sharing food with travelers, no abduction of women from other families and no defection among soldiers. It represented a day-to-day set of rules for people under Mongol control that was strictly enforced.

The Yasa also addressed and reflected Mongol cultural and lifestyle norms. Death via decapitation was the most common punishment unless the offender was of noble blood, when the offender would be killed by way of back-breaking, without shedding blood. Even minor offenses were punishable by death. For example, a soldier would be put to death if he did not pick up something that fell from the person in front of him. Those favoured by the Khan were often given preferential treatment within the system of law and were allowed several chances before being punished.

As Genghis Khan had set up an institution that ensured complete religious freedom, people under his rule were free to worship as they pleased if the laws of the Yassa were observed.

Conjectural laws

Many sources provide conjectures about the actual laws of the Yassa. The Yassa was so influential that other cultures appropriated and adapted portions of it or reworked it for ends of negative propaganda. (For instance, the number of offenses for which the death penalty was given was well-known by contemporaries.) However, Harold Lamb's Genghis Khan: The Emperor of All Men quotes a translation by François Pétis de la Croix. Although unable to come upon a complete list of the laws, he compiled several from Persian and Arabic chroniclers, such as Fras Rubruquis, and Giovanni da Pian del Carpine. Those laws are listed here:

 "It is ordered to believe that there is only one God, creator of heaven and earth, who alone gives life and death, riches and poverty as pleases Him—and who has over everything an absolute power, a different version states that there was liberty to worship God in whatever way suitable (Plantagenet Somerset Fry). 
 He [Chingis-Khan] ordered that all religions were to be respected and that no preference was to be shown to any of them. All this he commanded in order that it might be agreeable to Heaven. (al-Makrizi)
 Leaders of a religion, lawyers, physicians, scholars,  preachers, monks, persons who are dedicated to religious practice, the Muezzin (this latter appearing to be from the later period of Kublai Khan unless this was further translated there had been no specific reference made to any Muezzin and cities including mosques were levelled), physicians and those who bathe the bodies of the dead are to be freed from public charges. (Al-Makrizi)
 It is forbidden under penalty of death that anyone, whoever he be, shall be proclaimed emperor unless he has been elected previously by the princes, khans, officers, and other Mongol nobles in a general council.
 It is forbidden to make peace with a monarch, a prince or a people who has not submitted. [It is apparent that they presented certain proposals to the different states or kingdoms that existed that they should participate with them.]
 The ruling that divides men of the army into tens, hundreds, thousands, and ten thousands is to be maintained. He put leaders (princes/bogatyrs/generals/noyans) at the head of the troops and appointed commanders of thousands, hundreds, and tens. [al-Makrizi] This arrangement serves to raise an army fast and to form the units of commands.
 The moment that a campaign begins, each soldier must receive his arms from the hand of the officer who has them in charge. The soldier must keep them in good order and have them inspected by his officer before a battle. He ordered his successors to personally examine the troops and their armament before going to battle, to supply the troops with everything they needed for the campaign and to survey everything even to needle and thread. If any of the soldiers lacked a necessary thing, that soldier was to be punished. [al-Makrizi]
 It is forbidden, under death penalty, to pillage the enemy before the general commanding gives permission, but after that permission is given, the soldier must have the same opportunity as the officer and must be allowed to keep what he has carried off if he has paid his share to the receiver for the emperor.
 He ordered that soldiers be punished for negligence and hunters who let an animal escape during a community hunt he ordered to be beaten with sticks and, in some cases, to be put to death. [Mirhond or Mirkhwand] (may appear excluded from some accounts, can be a more restricted Siberian-originating practice, but seems genuine).
 To keep the men of the army exercised, a great hunt shall be held every winter. On that account, it is forbidden for any man of the empire to kill from March to October deer, bucks, roe-bucks, hares, wild ass and some birds.
 It is forbidden to cut the throats of animals slain for food. When an animal is to be eaten, its feet must be tied, its belly ripped open and its heart squeezed in the hand until the animal dies. Then, its meat may be eaten, but if anyone slaughters an animal after the Mohammedan fashion, he is to be himself slaughtered. [al-Makrizi] [Women were not supposed to slaughter animals this way, possibly due to being weaker, there is no prohibition in the Yassa.]
 It is permitted to eat the blood and entrails of animals though this was forbidden before now.
 Every man who does not go to war must work for the empire without reward for a certain time.
 The man in whose possession a stolen horse is found must return it to its owner and add nine horses of the same kind. If he is unable to pay the fine, his children must be taken instead of the horses, and if he has no children, he himself shall be slaughtered like a sheep. [al-Makrizi] In the versions in which the provisions appear, the method of execution is likened to sheep and so it may be presumed for the law for the slaughter of animals (it is unclear in another version as of when their bodies should be cut in two parts). For lesser thefts the punishment shall be, according to the value of the thing stolen, a number of blows of a staff-seven, seventeen, twenty-seven, up to seven hundred. The bodily punishment may be avoided by paying nine times the worth of the thing stolen. (Another older version mentions no punishment for thefts under the value mentioned but is not so specified.)
 No subject of the empire may take a Mongol for servant or slave. Every man, except in rare cases, must join the army.
 Whoever gives food or clothing to a captive without the permission of his captor is to be put to death. [al-Makrizi]
 Whoever finds a runaway slave or captive and does not return him to the person to whom he belongs is to be put to death. [al-Makrizi] The word translated as "slave" means "captive taken for labor", the opponents of the Mongols who were usually regarded by them as facing a punishment for resisting the universal principles/the Mongol system, or what it aspired to via its codes and measures, the concept was passed on also to their descendants, based on the concepts of sedentary populations that degrade the people and criminal tribes, criminal often simply by their concept of resisting to the above-referred Mongol system, the word is "bo´ol", linked to modern "boolt", band for tying, "booch" (ch as in 'chaver' in Hebrew) is in the modern Mongolian both associated with the type of binding and process used in capture as a verb and then is translated as meaning "slave". However, other lands differ in meaning of "slave" though allied.  
 The law required the payment of a bride price. Though not mentioned in other sources, it may be that it is a dowry reference since the bride price is usually a custom restricted to specific Mongol tribes (but that may have appeared later). This may have been practiced earlier, but Chinggis Khan himself had never followed this custom, and it was little (if at all) referred to in the Nuvs Tobchaan Mongolyn. The bride price might have been considered as a useful deterrent to trade in women or simply a modernising experimental inversion from a dowry, but the Tatars' neighbours traded in women, which was prohibited, as was reported, by the Yassa and that marriage between the first and second degrees of kinship is forbidden. A man may marry two sisters or have several concubines, but under Buddhism and shamanism there was a progressive tendency for a marriage ceremony. Some Buddhist forms revived some casualty without marriage. The women should attend to the care of property, buying and selling at their pleasure, in another version, "Os Mongóis", by a Portuguese publisher of summarised histories of culture, the law is quoted as defining trade as their sphere. There is no exclusion from military participation, but it was reported more popular among Tatars as according to Islamic law, which was possible to follow only via Sufiism. Men should occupy themselves only with hunting and war.  
 Children born of a concubine are to be considered as legitimate and to receive their share of the heritage according to the disposition of it made by the father. The distribution of property is to be carried out on the basis of the senior son receiving more than the junior, the younger son inheriting the household of the father. The seniority of children depends upon the rank of their mother; one of the wives must always be the senior, to be determined chiefly by the time of her marriage. After the death of his father, a son may dispose of the father's wives except his mother. He may marry them or give them in marriage to others. All except the legal heirs are strictly forbidden to make use of any of the property of the deceased. [Vermadsky]
 An adulterer is to be put to death without any regard as to whether he is married or not. [al-Makrizi] The Yasa prescribes these rules: to love one another, not to commit adultery, not to steal, not to give false witness, not to be a traitor, and to respect old people and beggars. Whoever violates these commands is put to death. [Mahak'ia] Here are the laws of God which they call Iasax which were given to them [g288]: first, that they love one another; second, that they not commit adultery; not steal; not bear false witness; not betray anyone; and that they honor the aged and the poor. And should perpetrators of such crimes be found among them, they should be killed." [Grigor of Akanc]
 If two families wish to be united in marriage and have only young children, the marriage of the children is allowed if one is a boy and the other a girl. If the children are dead, the marriage contract may still be drawn up.
 It is forbidden to bathe or wash garments in running water during thunder.
 Whoever intentionally lies or practices sorcery, or spies upon the behavior of others or intervenes between the two parties in a quarrel to help the one against the other is also to be put to death. [al-Makrizi] (Intentional liars being included in this section in one of the versions, but it is not as definable in practice and may refer to methodical lying, which also appears in areas of earlier Asiatic influence in Europe but becomes particularly defined together with a Germanic version, which may have legal undertones, and a Latin practicality. It is a version intended to cause grievous harm to people and damage them and further particularly as a means of sabotage, but it is not completely clear. It can also have an aspect of those who practice lying with frivolous purposes.)
 Officers and chieftains who fail in their duty or do not come at the summons of the Khan are to be slain, especially in remote districts. If their offense is less grave, they must come in person before the Khan."
 Whoever is guilty of sodomy is also to be put to death [al-Makrizi]
 Urinating in water or ashes is punishable by death. [al-Makrizi]
 It was forbidden to wash clothing until completely worn out. [al-Makrizi]
 He forbade his people to eat food offered by another until the one offering the food tasted of it himself even though one is a prince and the other a captive. He forbade them to eat anything in the presence of another without having invited him to partake of the food. He forbade any man to eat more than his comrades and to step over a fire on which food was being cooked or a dish from which people were eating. [al-Makrizi]
 One may not dip their hands into water and must instead use a vessel for the drawing of water. [al-Makrizi]
 When the wayfarer passes by a group of people eating, he must eat with them without asking for permission, and they must not forbid him in that. [al-Makrizi]
 It was forbidden to show preference to a sect or to put emphasis on a word. When talking to someone, do not speak to them with a title, calling them by their name. That applies to even the Khan himself. [al-Makrizi]
 At the beginning of each year, all of the people must present their daughters to the Khan so that he may choose some of them for himself and his children. [al-Makrizi]
 Also, minors not higher than a cart wheel may not be killed in war.
 Also, abduction of women and sexual assault and or abuse of women are punishable by death.
 In cases of murder (punishment for murder) one could ransom himself by paying fines: for a Mohammedan - 40 golden coins (Balysh); and for a Chinese - one donkey. [Mirhod or Mirkhwand] 
 The Khan established a postal system so that he might quickly learn about the empire's news. 
 He ordered his son Chagatai to see that the Yassa was observed. [al-Makrizi]

Verkhovensky reports that the Yassa begins with an exhortation to honour men of all nations based on their virtues. The pragmatic admonition is borne out by the ethnic mixture created by Genghis Khan in the Mongolian medieval army for purpose of unity (Ezent Gueligen Mongolyn), the United Mongol Warriors.  
 Genghis Khan consulted teachers of religions, such as imams and probably rabbis and Christian priests, in compiling his law codex.

After Genghis Khan
Ogedei Khan, the third son of Genghis Khan and the second Great Khan, proclaimed the Great Yassa as an integral body of precedents, confirming the continuing validity of his father's commands and ordinances and added his own. Ogedei codified rules of dress, conduct of the kurultais, the military council. His two immediate successors followed the tradition of the Yassa.

The Mongols who lived in various parts of the empire began to add laws that were more appropriate to their areas.

Present-day influence
In the modern Turkish language (as used presently in Turkey), the word "law" is yasa, and the adjective "legal" is yasal. The word for a constitution, including the Constitution of Turkey, is Anayasa ("mother-law").

Etymology
The word yasa or yassa exists in both Mongolic and Turkic languages. It is believed that the word comes from the Mongolian verb zas- or yas- which means "to set in order". Tsereg zasakh is a phrase commonly found in old Mongolian texts like the Secret History that means "to set the soldiers in order" in the sense of rallying the soldiers before a battle. The supreme executive body of the present-day Mongolian government is called the Zasag-in gazar, which means the "place of Zasag", the "place of order". Zasag during the Qing dynasty referred to native provincial governors in Mongolia. The local office called Zasag-in gazar served as a court of the first instance and included secretaries and other officials. The verb zasaglakh means "to govern" in Mongolian. The Turkic verb yas-, which means "to spread", probably originated in Uighur Turkic and was firstly used by Uighur Turks.

See also
 Legal history

References

Sources

 
 Vernadsky, George: "The Mongols and Russia," Yale University Press, 1953, page 102
 Vernadsky, George: "The Scope and Content of Chingis Khan's Yasa." Printed in Harvard Journal of Asiatic Studies, Volume 3, 1938, pages 337-360
 Akner, Grigor of, History of the Nation of Archers, previously attributed to Maghak'ia the Monk. The Armenian text with English translation by Robert Blake and Richard Frye printed in vol. 12 of the Harvard Journal of Asiatic Studies #3-4 (1949) pp. 269–443
 Bar Hebraeus (Abul-Faraj), Makhtbhanuth Zabhne, Chronicon, the second portion, Chronicon Ecclesiasticum. The current edition of the Chronicon Ecclesiasticum is by Jean Baptiste Abbeloos and Thomas Joseph Lamy, Syriac text, Latin translation.
 Gibb, H.A.R. trans. and ed. (1958), The Travels of Ibn Baṭṭūṭa, A.D. 1325–1354 (Volumes 1-3), London: Hakluyt Society. Gibb, H.A.R.; Beckingham, C.F. trans. and eds. (1994), The Travels of Ibn Baṭṭūṭa, A.D. 1325–1354 (Volume 4), London: Hakluyt Society, .
 Areveltsi, Vardan(or Vardang), Havakumn Patmutsyun (Historical Compilation) at the Matenadaran in Yerevan, Armeni
 Mirhond (or Mirkhwand (byname of Muḥammad Ibn Khāvandshāh Ibn Maḥmūd), Rowzat oṣ-ṣafāʾ (Eng. trans. begun as History of the Early Kings of Persia, 1832
 Maqrizi (byname of Taqi al-Din Abu al-Abbas Ahmad ibn 'Ali ibn 'Abd al-Qadir ibn Muhammad al-Maqrizi (1364 – 1442), The History of the Ayyubit and Mameluke Rulers, translated into French by E Quatremére (2 vols. Paris, 1837-1845)
 Ayalon, D. "The Great Yasa of Chingiz Khan: a re-examination." A, Studia Islamica 33 (1971): 97-140.
 Morgan, D.O. "The 'Great Yasa of Chingiz Khan' and Mongol law in the Ilkhanate." Bulletin of the School of Oriental and African Studies 49/1 (1986): 163-176.

External links
 The Yasa of Chingis Khan. A code of honor, dignity, and excellence
 Yasa: The law of the People
 Nişanyan - Türkçe Etimolojik Sözlük

Legal codes
Legal history of Mongolia
Mongol Empire